Ruth Suckow (August 6, 1892 – January 23, 1960) was an American writer from Iowa. She wrote novels and stories.

Biography
Suckow was born in Hawarden, a small town in Sioux County on the Big Sioux River in far northwestern Iowa, where her father was the pastor of the Congregational church.

After leaving Hawarden in early 1898, the Suckow family lived in a number of towns in northern Iowa. In 1907, Suckow's father accepted a position at Grinnell College. Suckow graduated from Grinnell High School in 1910, and entered the college that fall. While a student at Grinnell, she became involved in dramatics.

Suckow left Grinnell College to study at the Curry School of Expression in Boston from 1913 to 1915. Her novel, The Odyssey of a Nice Girl (1925) reflects that experience. She left Boston to join her mother and sister who were living in Colorado for health reasons and enrolled at the University of Denver. She earned a B.A. in 1917 and an M.A. in English in 1918.

Early literary career
While in Denver, Suckow became interested in bee keeping, and spent a summer as an apprentice in a bee yard. After her mother died, Suckow moved to Earlville, a small town in eastern Iowa just west of Dubuque. For six years in the 1920s she ran a small apiary at the edge of town near an orchard, and began to write. Suckow spent her winters in other places, chiefly, New York's Greenwich Village.

In 1921, her first published story, "Uprooted," appeared in Midland, edited by John T. Frederick and published at the time in Iowa City. That story later appeared in the short story collection Iowa Interiors (1926). At Frederick's suggestion, she sent some stories to The Smart Set, a magazine edited by H. L. Mencken and George Jean Nathan, who accepted her stories.

Suckow had some of her stories published in The American Mercury, also edited by Mencken. Her first novel, Country People (1924), was followed by a remarkable number of novels published by Alfred A. Knopf. Echoes of Hawarden appear in many of them. In 1934, Farrar & Rinehart published Suckow's longest novel, The Folks, which followed the lives of a small-town Iowa family and was a Literary Guild selection.

During the Great Depression in 1936 she filed reports for the Farm Tenancy Committee.

Suckow's book New Hope (1942) portrays Hawarden during the period from 1890 to 1910 and describes the two-year stay of a young minister in the life of a new town.

Marriage and travels
In 1929, Suckow married Ferner Nuhn of Cedar Falls, Iowa. After their marriage, the couple lived in various parts of the United States, from Santa Fe, New Mexico, to rural New England. In the mid-1930s, they spent two years in Washington, D.C., where Nuhn worked on various forms of editing and writing for the U.S. Department of Agriculture, which was then under the direction of fellow Iowan Henry A. Wallace. Suckow served on President Franklin Roosevelt's Farm Tenancy Commission during the Depression. From 1937 to 1947, the couple lived in Cedar Falls, where Nuhn managed some family business interests.

In 1943, Suckow established contacts with the conscientious objectors to World War II. She had found World War I profoundly disturbing and her relationship with her father had been damaged by his activities supporting the war. In 1944, she traveled to the West Coast to visit six Civilian Public Service camps and one mental hospital. She spoke on writing and literature, read manuscripts, and encouraged young men. At the camp in Waldport, Oregon, she met the poet William Everson and continued to correspond with him for several years after the war.

Retirement and death
In the late 1940s, Suckow and Nuhn left Cedar Falls for health reasons: Suckow had arthritis and Nuhn suffered from hay fever.  They moved to Tucson, Arizona, and later to their final home in Claremont, California, where they were active in the Religious Society of Friends (Quakers).

Little came from Suckow's pen in the 1940s and 1950s. In 1952, Rinehart published Some Others and Myself, seven short stories and a remarkable spiritual memoir. In 1959, Viking Press brought out The John Wood Case, her last novel, which concerned an embezzlement case in a church.  Suckow died in 1960 at her home in Claremont, California, and is interred in Greenwood Cemetery in Cedar Falls, Iowa.

Legacy
Suckow's memoir is included in Some Others and Myself (1952). Her papers are in the Special Collections, University of Iowa Libraries, Iowa City.

An obituary appeared in The New York Times January 24, 1960. The only biography is Leedice McAnelly Kissane, Ruth Suckow (1969).

Literary legacy
Suckow is sometimes recalled as a "regionalist," but she did not consider herself such a writer. She said that she wrote about "people, situations, and their meaning." Her fiction was often set in Iowa but was not parochial in outlook. Today her writing has value for readers who enjoy good storytelling as well as for social historians looking for details about life in the early 20th century, particularly in the small towns of Iowa.

Suckow's childhood home has been preserved at Calliope Village in Hawarden, Iowa.

Works

Books
 Country People, (1924)
 The Odyssey of a Nice Girl, (1925)
 Iowa Interiors (title in UK: People and Houses), (1926)
 The Bonney Family, (1928)
 Cora, (1929)
 The Kramer Girls, (1930)
 Children And Older People, (1931)
 The Folks, (1934)
 Carry-Over, (1936)
 New Hope, (1936)
 A Memoir, (1952)
 Some Others and Myself, (1952)
 The John Wood Case, (1959)
 A Ruth Suckow Omnibus, (1988)
Source:

Magazine articles
 Iowa, (American Mercury #9, September 1926)
 A German Grandfather (American Mercury #12, November 1927)
 The Folk Idea in American Life (Scribner's 88, September 1930)
 Middle Western Literature, (English Journal #21, March 1932)
 An Almost Lost American Classic, (College English #14, March 1953)

Source:

References

External links
 
 Ruth Suckow Memorial Association
 Papers of Ruth Suckow
 Ruth Suckow Blog
 Country People
 Guide to the Ruth Suckow Collection at the University of Denver Retrieved 2014-09-26.

1892 births
1960 deaths
People from Hawarden, Iowa
20th-century American novelists
American women short story writers
American women novelists
Novelists from Iowa
20th-century American women writers
20th-century American short story writers